Single White Female 2: The Psycho is a 2005 American direct-to-video psychological thriller film and a sequel to the 1992 film Single White Female. Directed by Keith Samples, it stars Kristen Miller, Allison Lange and Brooke Burns.

Plot
In New York, PR colleagues and roommates Holly Parker and Jan Lambert are disputing a promotion in their agency. The unethical Jan deceives Holly and sends her to Chicago. Meanwhile, she seduces Holly's boyfriend David Kray, in the opening of a fancy restaurant he owns, and they have a one-night stand. When Holly arrives back home, she finds out David cheated on her with Jan, and decides to move into a new apartment. She schedules a meeting with the needy Tess Kositch and they become roommates and friends. When Tess cuts and dyes her hair identical to Holly's, she sees that her new roommate is obsessed with her. When Holly follows Tess to an underground nightclub called "Sin", she realizes that the girl is deranged. But Tess wants to be her friend and put Holly out of her misery by eliminating her former bad friends.

Cast
 Kristen Miller as Holly Parker
 Allison Lange as Tess Kositch
 Brooke Burns as Jan Lambert
 Todd Babcock as David Kray
 Francois Giroday as Leonard Ripken
 Tracey McCall as Lacey
 Rif Hutton as Detective Rousch
 Kyme as Doctor
 James Madio as Sam
 Gary Riotto as Wade

Critical response
Critical reception for Single White Female 2 has been predominantly negative. David Nusair of Reel Film Reviews panned the movie heavily and described it as "bad, incompetently made and with virtually no redeeming qualities." DVD Talk was also heavily critical of all aspects of the film, especially its title, and commented "Single White Female 2: The Psycho? Is that the title? Did I miss something? In the original Single White Female, did Jennifer Jason Leigh not play a psycho? Or maybe there was a Single White Female 1.5 in which all the pretty roommates did nothing but drink tea and give each other perms." DVD Verdict also panned the film and advised any potential viewers to avoid the movie as it was "the original movie minus all of the good stuff".

References

External links
 
 

2005 psychological thriller films
2005 films
2005 direct-to-video films
American psychological thriller films
American sequel films
Direct-to-video sequel films
Direct-to-video thriller films
Films about stalking
Films set in New York City
Films shot in Los Angeles
Sony Pictures direct-to-video films
2000s English-language films
2000s American films